Chelsea station is a disused railroad depot located at 150 Jackson Street in Chelsea, Michigan.  It was designated a Michigan State Historic Site in 1986 and listed on the National Register of Historic Places in 2010 as Michigan Central Railroad Chelsea Depot. The depot is the only known Michigan example designed by the well known Detroit architectural firm of Mason and Rice.

History
The land where the Chelsea Depot now sits was first settled in the 1830s by brothers Elisha and James Congdon.  In 1848, the Congdons offered the Michigan Central Railroad a plot of land along the rail line on which to build a station.  The railroad accepted, and the first structure built at the site was a freight station, completed in 1850. A series of freight stations followed, and the resulting freight business through the town spurred the growth of Chelsea in the mid-1800s.  However, in 1875, the last of these depots – a rather shabby shed – was destroyed under suspicious circumstances, and the railroad was slow to rebuild it.

In 1880, the railroad decided to establish passenger service in Chelsea, and chose the site for an experiment in improving the appearance and design of their rural stations. The railroad hired Detroit architects Mason and Rice to design the new station.  It was built and commissioned in 1880, and served as a Michigan Central Railroad passenger station until 1975, when the company went out of business.  Amtrak took over the line, and continued service until 1981, when the station was closed.  For the next few years, the station was used for storage.

In 1985, a group of Chelsea citizens formed the Chelsea Depot Association and, with the financial assistance of local businesses, purchased the depot to prevent the deterioration of the structure.  They began restoration efforts in 1986, and the depot was listed on the National Register of Historic Places in 1987.  The building has since been used as a rental space for community and private functions, and the Chelsea Depot Association continues to maintain it. In 2011, the exterior was repainted and new windows were installed.

Description
Mason and Rice's design for the Michigan Central Railroad Chelsea Depot is a Stick style Late Victorian design, with multiple gables and gingerbread decoration. A hip roof triple bay at each end delineates the two interior waiting rooms - one for women and one for men. Most of the structure is covered with horizontal clapboard, but the gable ends are covered with vertical board and batten. A brick patio surrounds the building. With the exception of some changes to the chimney structure and missing roof crests and finial, the depot's exterior looks exactly like it did when constructed.

References

External links

Chelsea Depot Association

Victorian architecture in Michigan
Buildings and structures in Washtenaw County, Michigan
Former Michigan Central Railroad stations
Railway stations on the National Register of Historic Places in Michigan
Railway stations in the United States opened in 1880
Railway stations closed in 1981
Michigan State Historic Sites in Washtenaw County, Michigan
National Register of Historic Places in Washtenaw County, Michigan
Former Amtrak stations in Michigan
Repurposed railway stations in the United States